Walhalla is the German form of Old Norse Valhöll, which is commonly anglicised as Valhalla. It may refer to:

 Walhalla (memorial), a hall of fame in Donaustauf, Bavaria, Germany.

Places

Australia 
 Walhalla, Victoria, Australia
 Electoral district of Walhalla, a former electoral district of the Victorian Legislative Assembly

United States 
Walhalla, California, former name of Gualala, California
 Walhalla, Michigan
 Walhalla Township, Lake of the Woods County, Minnesota
 Walhalla, North Dakota
 Walhalla Ravine, in the Clintonville neighborhood of Columbus, Ohio
 Walhalla, South Carolina
 Walhalla, Texas

Other uses 
 1260 Walhalla, a minor planet
 Hotel Walhalla, Osnabrück, Lower Saxony, Germany
 Walhalla (film), a 1995 Dutch thriller
 Walhalla IP, a former football stadium in Gothenburg, Sweden
 Walhalla-orden, a Finnish secret society founded 1783
 "Walhalla", a track by the Dutch trance act Gouryella
 Walhalla (typeface)

See also
 
 Valhall (disambiguation)
 Valhalla (disambiguation)

pt:Valhala (desambiguação)